Amberley may refer to:

Places

Australia 
Amberley, Queensland, near Ipswich, Australia
RAAF Base Amberley, a Royal Australian Air Force military airbase

United Kingdom 
 Amberley, Gloucestershire, England
 Amberley, Herefordshire, England
 Amberley, West Sussex, England
 Amberley railway station, in West Sussex, England
 Amberley Museum & Heritage Centre, near Arundel in West Sussex, England

Elsewhere
 Amberley, New Zealand, in north Canterbury
 Amberley, Ohio, US, a village in the Cincinnati metropolitan area
 Amberley, Ontario, Canada

People
 John Russell, Viscount Amberley (1842–1876), British politician and writer
 "Viscount Amberley", a courtesy title attached to that of Earl Russell
 Amberley Lobo (born 1990), Australian TV presenter
 Amberley Snyder (born 1991), American barrel racer

Other
 Josiah Amberley, the title character in The Adventure of the Retired Colourman by Arthur Conan Doyle
 Amberley Museum & Heritage Centre